Sparganothoides cornutana is a species of moth of the family Tortricidae. It is found from Mexico (Hidalgo, Veracruz and Chiapas), south into Guatemala. The habitat consists of mixed broadleaf woods.

The length of the forewings is 6.9–8.4 mm for males and 6.8–9.9 mm for females. The ground colour of the forewings is yellowish white to brownish yellow or golden yellow with scattered orange-and-brown scaling. The hindwings are white to light greyish white, becoming yellowish grey or grey toward the margins. Adults have been recorded on wing in July, August and November, probably in two generations per year.

Larvae have been reared on Quercus lobata.

Etymology
The species name refers to the protuberances on the head and is derived from Latin cornu (meaning horn).

References

Moths described in 2009
Sparganothoides